Raj Wali Shah Khattak  (1952  2015), commonly known as Raj Wali Shah Khattak, was a Pashto-language poet, critic and writer from Pakistan. He was conferred Tamgha-i-Imtiaz for his contributions to Pashto-language literature.

Dr. Raj Wali Shah Khattak was a great poet, writer, critic and a well-known figure in the field of literature. He was born on January 25, 1952, at village Dak Ismail Khel, District Nowshera. He passed his SSC examination from Govt. High School Dak Ismail Khel in 1968 with distinction. He passed HSSC examination in 1972 from BISE Peshawar by obtaining talent scholarship and then did his graduation from University of Peshawar in 1975. In 1977, he did his Master in Pashto and topped the entire province for which he was awarded Gold Medal. in 1985 he received his Ph.D Degree, under the topic for Research "Literary Movements in Pashto" from University of Peshawar. In 1985, he was also selected for Asian Youth Talent. Dr. Khattak was a trend-setter in Pashto research and his more than ten books have been published so far, which manifest his new and creative literary trends. He has compiled more than 100 critical reviews on various books and other academic works. He was a Resource Person for Pakistan Broadcasting Corporation, Pakistan Television, Khyber TV and BBC London as well as Voice of America on themes of diverse nature. His in-depth reviews find place in international print and electronic media including New York Times and Washington Post. Dr. Khattak has also worked as Director of Pashto Academy, University of Peshawar from 1995 to 2004 and during his tenure as Director the Academy was put on modern lines and besides establishment of a language laboratory, website was also launched. On August 14, 2006, President Islamic Republic of Pakistan conferred upon Dr. Raj Wali Shah Khattak “Tamgha-i-Imtiaz” for his meritorious performance towards Pashto language and literature. In 2006, Dr. Khattak was selected among the Fulbright scholars and he was given scholarship for post doctorate from University of Pennsylvania, USA. He was the first ever Pashto scholar selected for Fulbright. In 2007, he was appointed as Chairman Department of Pashto followed by Director Centre of Pashto Language and Literature, University of Peshawar and then was appointed as Dean faculty of Islamic Studies and Oriental Languages, University of Peshawar wherefrom he got retired from university service in January 2012 upon superannuation. Dr. Raj Wali Shah Khattak possessed a special place in the modern Pashto Poetry. His collection “SANGZAR” has been termed a precursor of poetic poetry by renowned critics of the time. Dr. Khattak has to his credit more than 60 research articles published in journals of international repute. He has presented papers of immense academic value on prestigious forums of Sindhi Language Authority (Hyderabad), Nazriyya Pakistan Foundation (Lahore), Sachal Chair (Khairpur University), Allama Iqbal Open University (Islamabad), Academy of Letters Islamabad, Quaid-e-Azam University Islamabad, University of Baluchistan Quetta, Baluchistan Study Centre, University of Ningrahar Jalalabad, Ministry of Culture and Information, Govt. of Afghanistan, Kabul, Department of Culture Jalalabad, Culture Department Hyderabad Sindh, UNESCO Karachi, and Department of Culture and Tourism Govt. of Sindh. These papers have earned great appreciation from national and international scholars of the subject. In view of his great academic standing, a number of institutions have placed him on the Board of Governors/ Directors. Dr Khattak has been the moving force in arranging seminars on new Pashto Script. He was an authority on the new script. He has remained Editor in chief of monthly journal “Pashto” for about nine years. Several special numbers of the preceding journal are considered as reference work in the field. Dr. Raj Wali Shah Khattak, among a lot of other qualities, had an outstanding command on Urdu and English as well, the press release concluded. His programs at “Deewa Radio, Voice of America” were very much liked particularly his in depth knowledge in the said programs on record, regarding “Tasawwuf” (Sufism) compel us to evaluate his personality for determining his place in Sufism. 

Dr. Khattak is a trend-setter in Pashto research and his ten books have been published so far. He has compiled more than 100 critical reviews on various books and other academic works. President Islamic Republic Pakistan, Gen. Parvez Musharraf conferred Tamgha-i-Imtiaz (TI) to Professor Dr. Raj Wali Shah Khattak of Pashto Academy, University of Peshawar for his meritorious contribution to Pashto literature, says a press release. Dr. Khattak has also worked as Director of Pashto Academy, University of Peshawar from 1995 to 2004 Dr. Raj Wali Shah Khattak possesses a special place in the modern Pashto Poetry. His collection “Sangzar” has been termed a precursor of poetic poetry by renowned critics of the time. Dr. Khattak has to his credit more than 60 research articles published in journals of international repute.

He has left us on 20th July, 2015 due to sudden demise on his way back from Swat.  He was conferred Tamgha-i-Imtiaz for his contributions to Pashto-language literature.

Books
Fourteen Books of Dr. Rajwali Shah Khattak have been published so far. He is widely known for the following book:

 Da Pukhto Adabi Tehreekoona (Literary Movements in Pashto).
 Zeest Rozgar Da Faqir Jamil Beg (The Life Style of Faqir Jamil Beg).
 Manaqib-e-Faqir (Faqir Eulogies).
 Pashto Zhaba (Dictionary) (The Pashto Language Dictionary).
 Da Pukhto Nawi Imla (The New Pashto Script).
 Sangzar (Poetry). 
 Da Rehman Pa Shair (On the poetry of Rehman).
 Intangible Heritage of the Walled City of Peshawar [English] (UNESCO Pakistan).
 An Intangible Heritage [English] Published By InterLit Foundation.
 Toori Chi Rana Kawai (Letters that shine).
 Rohi Mataloona [English] Published by InterLit Foundation Peshawar.
 Pashtuno ke Kasb-o-Hunar[Urdu], Loc Virsa Islamabad.
 Pashtunwali [Urdu], Loc Virsa Islamabad.
 An introduction to Pashtun Culture {English} , 
 Rohology, the study of Pashto, Pashtuns and Pashtunwali { Pashto },
 Pashtun Lisan ul ghaib.
 Ghani Khan da rang o noor shair
 Da Fikr Malghalary (Published after his death by his son, Rishteen Wali)

References

Pashto-language writers
Pashto-language poets
1952 births
2015 deaths
Pakistani literary critics
Recipients of Tamgha-e-Imtiaz
Pashtun people